This is a list of ISO 639 codes and IETF language tags (BCP 47) for individual constructed languages, complete .

ISO 639-2 and ISO 639-5 also have the code  for other artificial languages. The BCP 47 subtag  can be used to create a suitable private use tag for any constructed language that has not been assigned an official language tag (e.g.,  could be used for Solresol).

The old SIL language identifiers (usually written in capitals) are officially obsolete and should no longer be used. They formed the basis of the ISO 639-3 language codes, but some SIL identifiers that had been retired before the establishment of ISO 639-3 were later assigned to different languages within ISO.

The IANA Language Subtag Registry (for IETF’s language tags defined in BCP 47) was updated on 29 July 2009 to include all ISO 639-3 and ISO 639-5 identifiers in use at that time.

List of codes 

BCP 47 has also reserved  for simplified languages.

Writing systems 
When a constructed language has multiple writing systems, the following BCP 47 tags can be used to differentiate between them.

(This table only includes primary writing systems of each language, so it does not include examples such as Esperanto written in the Shavian alphabet.)

See also 
 Language code
 List of ISO 639-1 codes

Notes

References

External links
 ConLang Code Registry (CLCR) assigns codes to constructed languages out of the "reserved for local use" codes. It also indexes the use of  codes.
 Change Request Index ISO-639-3. Rejected registers for artificial languages.

Constructed languages
Language identifiers